Martin Samuel  is a British three-time Oscar nominated hair stylist in the category of Best Makeup and Hairstyling. He is most famous for doing the hair on the first three Pirates of the Caribbean movies along with Ve Neill. He has had over 55 credits since 1974.

Samuel was appointed Member of the Order of the British Empire (MBE) in the 2021 New Year Honours for services to international screen hair styling.

Academy Award Nominations

2003 Academy Awards-Nominated for Pirates of the Caribbean: The Curse of the Black Pearl, nomination shared with Ve Neill. Lost to The Lord of the Rings: The Return of the King.
2007 Academy Awards-Nominated for Pirates of the Caribbean: At World's End, nomination shared with Ve Neill. Lost to La Vie en rose.
2012 Academy Awards-Nominated for Hitchcock, nomination shared with Howard Berger and Peter Montagna. Lost to Les Misérables.

Selected filmography

Hitchcock (2012)
Pirates of the Caribbean: At World's End  (2007)
Pirates of the Caribbean: Dead Man's Chest (2006)
Pirates of the Caribbean: The Curse of the Black Pearl (2003)

References

External links

Living people
Best Makeup BAFTA Award winners
Year of birth missing (living people)
British hairdressers
Place of birth missing (living people)
Members of the Order of the British Empire